Remodeled is an American reality television series which premiered on The CW as a midseason replacement on January 17, 2012. The program was greenlighted to series status on May 17, 2011, to air in the 2011–12 television season. The hour-long series is hosted by modeling expert Paul Fisher and is produced by Fly On The Wall Entertainment and Sony Pictures Television. Executive producers are Allison Grodner, Rich Meehan, Amy Palmer Robertson, Rachel Tung, Greg Seuss, and Erik Stone.

Premise
Each episode Paul Fischer visits small-town agencies all over the United States in order to add them into 'The Network', a conglomeration of all the agencies he has visited, in the hopes of finding tomorrow's supermodels. Each agency, usually a run down scam-like agency, is completely made over to become a legitimate respectable agency. Simultaneously he and his team, Anna Alschbach, Joseph Villanueva, J.T, and Olga Tavarez, scout model hopefuls and send them to castings for fashion week and other clients. Models featured and discovered on the show include Annelise Adams, Bobby Rake, Mexico's Next Top Model winner Mariana Bayón, Guess model Meghan Wiggins, Levi Strauss & Co. model Halle Arbaugh and Shaughnessy Brown.

Agencies featured on the show include:

 Arquette & Associates in Minneapolis, Minnesota (episode 1)
 Fierce Modeling School and Agency in Rapid City, South Dakota (episode 2)
 Emerge Talent Management in Orlando, Florida (episode 3)
 Courtier Model and Talent Management in Phoenix, Arizona (episode 4)
 Centro Models in St. Louis, Missouri (episode 5)
 Blaze Modelz in Hermosa Beach, California (episode 6)
 Active Image Models in Columbus, Ohio (episode 7)
 Las Vegas Models, Lenz Agency in Las Vegas, Nevada (episode 8)

Episodes

Ratings 
The show premiered with one of The CW's lowest rated premieres ever.

Awards
The series earned the award for best reality program at the 2012 Banff World Media Festival.

References

External links
 Official website
 The Network Talent website
 Bobby Rake at Models.com
 Shaughnessy Brown at Models.com 

2010s American reality television series
2012 American television series debuts
2012 American television series endings
The CW original programming
English-language television shows
Fashion-themed reality television series
Makeover reality television series
Modeling-themed reality television series
Television series by Sony Pictures Television